Shane O'Regan (born 2000) is an Irish hurler who plays for Cork  Championship club Sarsfields  ,and at inter-county level with the Cork senior hurling team. He usually lines out as a full-forward.

Playing career

Imokilly

O'Regan was added to the Imokilly divisional team in advance of the 2019 Cork Championship. He made a number of appearances throughout the game and was selected as a substitute when Imokilly faced Glen Rovers in the final on 20 October 2019. O'Regan was introduced as a 53rd-minute substitute and claimed a winners' medal after scoring a point in the 2-17 to 1-16 victory.

Cork

Under-17 and under-20

O'Regan first lined out for Cork when he was added to the extended panel of the Cork under-17 team for the 2017 Munster Championship. He remained a member of the extended panel throughout the campaign which saw Cork claim the Munster Championship after a 3-13 to 1-12 defeat of Waterford in the final. On 6 August 2017, O'Regan made the team's match-day panel when he was selected amongst the substitutes for the All-Ireland final against Dublin. He remained on the bench throughout the game but claimed a winners' medal after the 1-19 to 1-17 victory.

On 3 July 2019, O'Regan made his first appearance for Cork's inaugural under-20 team in the Munster Championship. He scored 1-06 from full-forward in the 1-20 to 0-16 defeat of Limerick. On 23 July 2019, O'Regan scored three points from play in a 3-15 to 2-17 defeat by Tipperary in the Munster final. He was again selected at full-forward when Cork faced Tipperary for a second time in the All-Ireland final on 24 August 2019, however, he ended the game on the losing side after a 5-17 to 1-18 defeat.

Senior

On 29 December 2019, O'Regan had his first involvement with the Cork senior team when he was selected amongst the substitutes for Cork's Munster League game against Waterford.

Honours

Watergrasshill
Cork Premier 2 Under-16 Hurling Championship: 2016

Imokilly
Cork Senior Hurling Championship: 2019

Cork
All-Ireland Under-20 Hurling Championship: 2020
Munster Under-20 Hurling Championship: 2019
All-Ireland Under-17 Hurling Championship: 2017
Munster Under-17 Hurling Championship: 2017

References

2000 births
Living people
Watergrasshill hurlers
Sarsfields (Cork) hurlers
Imokilly hurlers
Cork inter-county hurlers